"Give Them Jesus" is the lead single by singer-songwriter released in October 2011, from Jaci Velasquez's studio album, Diamond.

Composition
"Give Them Jesus" is originally in the key of D Major, with a tempo of 102 beats per minute.

Commercial performance
"Give Them Jesus" peaked at No. 33 on the Billboard Hot Christian Songs chart on January 14, 2012. It spent 20 weeks on the chart.

Charts

References 

2011 singles
American songs
Contemporary Christian songs
2011 songs
Songs written by Ronnie Freeman